The 1977 NCAA Division I Tennis Championships were the 32nd annual tournament to determine the national champion of NCAA men's college tennis. Matches were played during May 1977 at the Dan Magill Tennis Complex in Athens, Georgia on the campus of the University of Georgia. A total of three championships were contested: men's team, singles, and doubles.

The men's team championship was won by the Stanford, their third team national title. The Cardinal defeated Trinity (TX) in the final, 5–4. The men's singles title was won by Matt Mitchell from Stanford, and the men's doubles title went to Bruce Manson and Christopher Lewis of USC.

Team tournament

Singles tournament

Finals bracket

Doubles tournament

Finals bracket

See also
NCAA Division I Women's Tennis Championship (introduced 1982)
NCAA Men's Division II Tennis Championship
NCAA Men's Division III Tennis Championship

References

External links
List of NCAA Men's Tennis Champions
List of NCAA Women's Tennis Champions

NCAA Division I tennis championships
NCAA  Division I Tennis Championships
NCAA  Division I Tennis Championships
NCAA Division I Tennis Championships